Santiago Santamaria i Puig (26 July 1957 – 16 February 2011), known as Santi Santamaria, was a Spanish Catalan avant-garde chef. He was the first Catalan chef and owner to have his restaurant receive three stars  from the Michelin Guide (Can Fabes in 1994).

His second restaurant (Sant Celoni) was awarded two Michelin stars.  

His style was a modern interpretation of traditional Catalan cuisine and slow food, focusing on fresh Mediterranean ingredients.

Santamaria made controversial accusations against the "molecular gastronomy" of other Spanish chefs, singling out Ferran Adrià.

Santamaria died on 16 February 2011 in his restaurant in Marina Bay Sands, Singapore of a heart attack.

References

External links
 Gourmandia Profile

Chefs from Catalonia
Spanish chefs
1957 births
2011 deaths
Head chefs of Michelin starred restaurants